Senran Kagura is an anime television series based on the video game series by Marvelous AQL and Tamsoft. The series revolve around a group of five girls who are training to become ninjas at the secret Hanzou Academy, whilst facing off against the dark ninja of Hiritsu Hebi Girl's Academy.

The first series, known as Senran Kagura Ninja Flash in its English release, was directed by Takashi Watanabe at Artland with scripts by Takao Yoshioka and character designs by Takashi Torii. The series aired in Japan between January 6, 2013 and March 24, 2013 and was licensed in North America by Funimation, who simulcast the series as it aired. An original video animation by Hoods Entertainment was released on March 24, 2015.

A second TV series, Senran Kagura Shinovi Master: Tokyo Youma Chapter, is being directed by Tetsuya Yanagisawa and produced by TNK, with scripts written by Yukinori Kitajima and character designs handled by Junji Goto. The season began airing from October 13, 2018 on AT-X, Tokyo MX, and BS11. Crunchyroll is simulcasting the series in censored and uncensored versions with Funimation streaming an English dub.

Episode list

Senran Kagura Ninja Flash (2013)

Bonus episodes
The following original video animations were originally released with each BD/DVD volume. Due to rights issues, these are not included in Funimation's English home video release.

Senran Kagura Estival Versus – Festival Eve Full of Swimsuits (2015 OVA)

Senran Kagura Shinovi Master (2018)

Notes

References

Senran Kagura
Senran Kagura